The Orphan Bird (also known as the Orphanay or Rafanay) is a legendary bird from medieval bestiaries. It had a peacock's neck, an eagle's beak, a swan's feet, and a crane's body. It would lay its eggs in the sea. The good eggs would float, while the bad eggs would sink.

References 

Legendary birds
Medieval European legendary creatures
Mythological hybrids